Richard John Knight (born 26 May 1959 in Cambridge, Cambridgeshire, England, UK) is a former international motorcycle speedway rider who represented Great Britain in the team which finished third in the 1985 World Team Cup.

He rode for Mildenhall Fen Tigers, Ipswich Witches, Wimbledon Dons, Reading Racers, Berwick Bandits and the King's Lynn Stars. He won the South African (Open) Championship in 1989.

In 2008 he returned to speedway to become Team Manager of Mildenhall Fen Tigers following the club's takeover in August of that year.

World Final Appearances

Individual World Championship
 1990 -  Bradford, Odsal Stadium - 10th - 7pts

World Team Cup
 1985 –  Long Beach, Veterans Memorial Stadium (with Jeremy Doncaster / Phil Collins / Kelvin Tatum / John Davis) – 3rd – 13pts (2)

References

1959 births
Living people
British speedway riders
English motorcycle racers
Ipswich Witches riders
Wimbledon Dons riders
King's Lynn Stars riders
Reading Racers riders
Mildenhall Fen Tigers riders
Berwick Bandits riders